In the Heart of the Sea is a 2015 historical adventure-drama film directed and produced by Ron Howard and written by Charles Leavitt. It is based on Nathaniel Philbrick's 2000 non-fiction book of the same name, about the sinking of the American whaling ship Essex in 1820, an event that in part inspired Herman Melville's 1851 novel Moby-Dick. An international co-production between the United States and Spain, the film stars Chris Hemsworth, Benjamin Walker, Cillian Murphy, Tom Holland, Ben Whishaw, and Brendan Gleeson.

The film premiered in New York City on December 7, 2015, and was released in cinemas in the United States on December 11, 2015, by Warner Bros. Pictures. In the Heart of the Sea received mixed reviews from critics and was a box office bomb, grossing only $93 million against a $100 million budget.

Plot
In 1850, author Herman Melville visits innkeeper Thomas Nickerson, the last survivor of the sinking of the whaleship Essex, offering money in return for his story. Nickerson initially refuses, but then finally agrees when his wife intervenes.

The story turns to 1820: a whaling company in Nantucket has refitted the Essex to participate in a whale hunt and get back some lucrative whale oil, and 14-year-old Nickerson signs on as a cabin boy. The owners hire veteran whaler Owen Chase as first mate, though he is disappointed not to receive a captain's commission. The captain is George Pollard, an inexperienced mariner from an established whaling family who envies Chase's skill and popularity. Chase and Pollard clash, leading Pollard to sail into a storm against Chase's advice. The two agree to put their differences aside, rather than risking their reputations by returning to port without profit, and soon, the crew kills their first bull sperm whale.

Three months pass with no further successes, and Pollard realizes that the Atlantic Ocean holds no sighting of whales. The Essex sails past Cape Horn to the Pacific, hoping for better luck in catching one. In Atacames, Ecuador, the officers meet a Spanish captain who tells them his crew found the bountiful "Offshore Grounds" 2,000 miles to the west, but claims that a vengeful "white whale" destroyed his ship, killing six of his men. Dismissing the story as a myth, Pollard and Chase lead the expedition west. They find the undisturbed grounds, but when they launch the whaling boats, a massive bull sperm whale, its skin whitened by scars, attacks; damaging the boats and turning on the ship.

Chase harpoons it from the Essexs deck, but the whale rams the ship's hull, killing two men. With the hull stove in and pumps not working, the crew abandons the sinking Essex in the three intact whaling boats, and must sail hundreds of miles to shore with very limited supplies. The whale follows and attacks again, but they escape to the tiny Henderson Island, George Pollard presumes it could be Ducie Island, and admits there is no way to be certain without instruments. While gathering food, Chase discovers the long dead corpses of earlier castaways, after which the crew fears that they might die waiting on the island before another ship passes by. Just four men decide to stay, while the rest set sail again on the boats, with the hope of drifting along the trade winds and finding better lands. Soon after, one of the men dies, and the remaining crew reluctantly decide to cannibalise him.

The older Nickerson is overcome with remorse for his cannibalism and stops his story, thinking his wife could not love him if she knew about it; however, when his wife comforts him, assuring him that she still loves him, he feels encouraged enough to finish. Back in the 1820s, the three boats are separated by the currents and one is lost. The other two further resort to cannibalism to survive, with Pollard's cousin Henry Coffin sacrificing himself.

The white whale suddenly returns, and Chase gets into position for a final attack. The whale breaches for a moment, allowing Chase to observe a portion of his previously thrown harpoon still embedded above the whale's eye. Chase hesitates, and stares into the whale's left eye, as the whale stares back at Chase. After a moment of thought, Chase lowers his harpoon, deciding not to kill the creature. Following this encounter, the whale swims away peacefully, and is never seen again.

A passing ship rescues Pollard's boat, but Chase's boat continues to drift with no food or water. Finally, with the survivors on the verge of death, the latter's boat reaches Chile's Alejandro Selkirk Island. The survivors are all brought back to Nantucket, where they finally reunite with their distraught families. The Nantucket ships' owners ask Pollard and Chase to cover up the story to protect the industry's reputation, but Chase, deciding he has had enough of their dishonesty and that he no longer cares about them, refuses to go along and resigns. Pollard reveals the truth in the inquiry, much to their anger.

Nickerson relates that a ship was sent to Henderson Island to rescue the surviving men there, Chase continued sailing the seas and became a merchant captain, which his wife had said earlier would not change her love for him, and Pollard led another expedition to find and kill the whale. However, he was never able to find the animal and the ship ran aground off the Hawaiian Islands and was forced to retire. Melville departs to compose his novel, Moby-Dick, beginning by writing its first line: "Call me Ishmael".

Cast
 Chris Hemsworth as Owen Chase, the first mate
 Benjamin Walker as Captain George Pollard Jr.
 Cillian Murphy as Matthew Joy, the second mate
 Tom Holland as Thomas Nickerson, the cabin boy
 Brendan Gleeson as Old Thomas Nickerson
 Ben Whishaw as Herman Melville
 Michelle Fairley as Mrs. Nickerson
 Gary Beadle as William Bond
 Frank Dillane as Owen Coffin (named Henry Coffin in the film)
 Edward Ashley as Barzillai Ray
 Charlotte Riley as Peggy Chase 
 Donald Sumpter as Paul Mason
 Brooke Dimmock as Phoebe Chase
 Jamie Sives as Isaac Cole
 Joseph Mawle as Benjamin Lawrence
 Paul Anderson as Caleb Chappel
 Luca Tosi as William Wright
 Sam Keeley as Ramsdell

Production

Casting
The film was in development back in 2000, with Barry Levinson set to direct for Miramax Films.

Chris Hemsworth was cast to play the lead, Owen Chase, in June 2012. Tom Holland won the role of young Nickerson in April 2013. Cillian Murphy signed on as Matthew Joy in June. Before Benjamin Walker was set to play the Captain, other actors that were considered included Benedict Cumberbatch, Tom Hiddleston, and Henry Cavill.

Filming
Principal photography began in September 2013 in London and at Warner Bros. Studios, Leavesden in Hertfordshire, England. It was also shot on location on the island of La Gomera (plus some scenes on Lanzarote) in the Canary Islands, Spain. For the storm scenes, the production team built a water tank at Leavesden Studios, where a deck was built on top of a gimbal to mimic the pitch of a storm. To get the right effect, 500 gallons of icy water were poured from cannons.

During one point of filming, the cast and crew were forced to retreat to their hotel by a storm off the Canary Islands, which turned into a rare flash flood. The production shut down for a day and a half, expanding the shoot to 73 days, exactly as filmmakers expected.

In an interview on Jimmy Kimmel Live!, Hemsworth stated that to prepare for the role of starving sailors, the cast were on a diet of 500–600 calories a day to lose weight. Hemsworth dropped his weight from 215 to 175 pounds (97.5 to 79.3 kg) to play Owen, saying that In the Heart of the Sea is "physically and emotionally the hardest movie that I've been a part of... Losing the weight to this length, I just never want to do it again, but it had such an emotional effect on us... in some small way, we felt like we were doing what these men went through justice."

Music
Roque Baños composed the film score. He was recommended by Hans Zimmer, who was initially approached.

Release
The film was originally scheduled to be released in the United States and Canada on March 13, 2015, but was later pushed back to December 11 in order to convert the film into 3D as well as to give it higher chances of being an awards season contender. Internationally, Warner Bros. decided to open the film early overseas—a week before its United States December 11 opening—to avoid competition with Star Wars: The Force Awakens, which began its theatrical overseas from December 16. The film was released in the Dolby Vision format in Dolby Cinema in North America.

Home media
In the Heart of the Sea was released on DVD, Blu-ray & Blu-ray 3D on March 8, 2016. It was released on 4K Ultra HD Blu-ray on May 17, 2016.

Reception

Box office
In the Heart of the Sea was one of two flops released by Warner Bros in 2015, the other being Pan. It grossed $25 million in North America and $68.9 million in other territories for a worldwide total of $93.9 million, against a production budget of $100 million.

In the United States and Canada, the film opened on December 11, 2015, in 3,103 theaters, including a number of 3D and IMAX theaters. Box Office Mojo projected an opening weekend gross of $18 million, noting that the film's only competition was with the holdover of The Hunger Games: Mockingjay – Part 2 (in its fourth weekend of play). The film earned $3.8 million on its opening day, including $575,000 from its early Thursday night showings. In its opening weekend, it earned $11.1 million, finishing below expectations and narrowly losing to Mockingjay – Part 2, which earned $11.4 million. Many box office analysts said the low opening was because audiences' enthusiasm was focused on the arrival of Star Wars: The Force Awakens the following week. Regarding the film's disappointing opening, Jeff Goldstein, Warner Bros. distribution executive vice president said, "We stand behind Ron and his vision for the story, we believe in him. He's a terrific filmmaker. But some movies work and unfortunately some movies don't." In its third weekend the film was pulled from 72.3% of theaters (3,103 to 685), the 4th biggest drop in history at the time.

In the Heart of the Sea was released internationally a week prior to its United States opening in 38 markets and grossed a total of $18.5 million with 3.3 million admissions on over 9,500 screens. 50% of the plays were in 3D with 156 IMAX theaters which accounted for 7% of the total opening. It went No. 1 in Russia and the CIS ($2 million), Italy ($1.7 million) and several other Asian markets such as Thailand and Taiwan and No. 2 in South Korea with $2.6 million, behind local hit Inside Men, Mexico with $1.9 million, behind The Good Dinosaur and Brazil with $1.3 million, behind The Hunger Games: Mockingjay – Part 2.

Critical response
On Rotten Tomatoes, the film has an approval rating of 42% based on 241 reviews and an average rating of 5.5/10. The site's critical consensus reads, "The admirably old-fashioned In the Heart of the Sea boasts thoughtful storytelling to match its visual panache, even if it can't claim the depth or epic sweep to which it so clearly aspires." On Metacritic, the film has a score of 47 out of 100 based on 47 critics, indicating "mixed or average reviews". Audiences polled by CinemaScore gave the film an average grade of "B+" on an A+ to F scale.

Ignatiy Vishnevetsky of The A.V. Club calls the film "ravishing and very corny".

Accolades

See also
 Adaptations of Moby-Dick
 The Whale, a 2013 BBC One television film which depicted the same events

References

External links
 
 
 
 
 
 

2015 films
2015 3D films
2010s action adventure films
2010s adventure drama films
2010s disaster films
2010s English-language films
American 3D films
American adventure drama films
American survival films
Australian action adventure films
Disaster films based on actual events
Drama films based on actual events
Dune Entertainment films
English-language Spanish films
Films about death
Films about survivors of seafaring accidents or incidents
Films about whaling
Films based on Moby-Dick
Films based on non-fiction books
Films directed by Ron Howard
Films produced by Joe Roth
Films scored by Roque Baños
Films set in Nantucket
Films set in the 1820s
Films set in the Pacific Ocean
Films set on ships
Films shot in the Canary Islands
Films shot at Warner Bros. Studios, Leavesden
Films with screenplays by Rick Jaffa and Amanda Silver
IMAX films
Imagine Entertainment films
Sea adventure films
Seafaring films
Spanish 3D films
Spanish adventure drama films
Spanish disaster films
Village Roadshow Pictures films
Warner Bros. films
2015 drama films
Films shot at Pinewood Studios
2010s American films